Gerhard Wilck (17 June 1898 – 5 April 1985) was the German commander who defended the German city of Aachen in the Battle of Aachen. He surrendered on 21 October 1944 against the orders of Hitler, after a stubborn defence and bitter urban warfare.

References

 Ambrose, S. E. (1997). Citizen Soldiers: The U.S. Army from the Normandy Beaches to the Bulge to the Surrender of Germany, June 7, 1944-May 7, 1945. New York, NY: Simon & Schuster. 
 Dear, I., Foot, M. R. D., & Dear, I. (2005). The Oxford companion to World War II. Oxford: Oxford University Press. 

1898 births
1985 deaths
People from Lubawa
German Army officers of World War II
People from West Prussia
German Army personnel of World War I